The England Lions (formerly England A) cricket team is England and Wales' "second-tier" team, below the full England cricket team. It is largely intended as a way for promising young cricketers to gain experience of playing international cricket.

England B and England A

Although primarily intended as a touring team, for several years in the 1990s they played one match in England at the start of each season: between 1992 and 1995 against the previous season's county champion and in 1996 and 1997 against a Rest of England team. England A also played two List A games against the full Sri Lankan touring side in England in 1991.

Previously a second tier team known as "England B" played one game against the Pakistanis in 1982 and had made a full tour of Sri Lanka in 1985/86. The first full tour by a team named "England A" was to Zimbabwe in 1989/90, and consisted of three first-class matches and three 50-over games. On this occasion England A played against the full Zimbabwe side, but on subsequent tours their most important opponents have usually been the equivalent A teams of the countries they have been touring. However, England A has toured Australia but had played a match against their Australian A team counterparts until 2021.

They also often play matches against state or provincial sides, and in 2000/01 England A participated in the Busta Cup, the West Indian domestic first-class competition, finishing in third place out of the eight teams taking part. In 2003/04 England A took part in India's Duleep Trophy competition, but failed to progress beyond the group stages after losing both their matches. There were no England A matches played in the period between these two tours.

England Lions

The newly rebranded England Lions was then integrated with the ECB National Academy, with touring parties taken from the Academy squad. On 15 June 2007, it was announced by the ECB (English & Welsh Cricket Board) the inaugural Lions side would play a one-day touring warm-up match against the West Indies at Worcester. Later in the summer against the touring Indians the Lions drew a 3-day match at Chelmsford and had a one-day match abandoned due to rain at Northampton.

On 4 January 2008 the squad for the England Lions tour of India was named, with Sussex batsman Michael Yardy named as captain. The team competed in the 2008 Duleep Trophy domestic first-class competition in addition to friendly matches.

Current squad
The following players were named in the squad for the 2021 England Lions tour to Australia.

The captain of the side typically varies from series to series.

 = withdrawn before start of tour or during warm-up matches.

Results summary

Season-by-season

Head-to-head

Up to date as of 16 December 2015.

See also
 National Cricket Performance Centre

Notes

England in international cricket
Wales in international cricket
National 'A' cricket teams
C
C